Allocasuarina striata, commonly known as the small bull oak, stalked oak-bush or the tall oak-bush, is a shrub of the genus Allocasuarina native to South Australia.

Description
It has a dense, erect and rounded habit, with smooth bark that becomes fissured on older trees.
Fruits that form later are small and woody cylindrical cones containing numerous valves with smooth semi-flat black seeds that have a papery wing.

Distribution
Endemic to South Australia the species is confined to an area in the south east of the state on the southern Mount Lofty Ranges, the Fleurieu Peninsula and on Kangaroo Island. It grows in heath and sandy lateritic soils. When cultivated it grows best in full sun or part shade and is found on hills, footslopes and plains. It will tolerate drought, moderate frost and soil salinity.

Uses
A hardy foliage plant it is often grown as a low informal hedge in roadside verges and raised beds. Used in reserves and parks as a soil binding plant for reserves which also provides bird habitat and refuge for small animals and acts as a windbreak. Aboriginal peoples used the plant for food, medicine, to make implements like boomerangs and shields, and to make adhesives for canoe sealant.

Classification
The species was first formally described as Casuarina striata by the botanist Ellen D. Macklin in 1927.  It was later reclassified by Lawrence Alexander Sidney Johnson into the Allocasuarina genera in 1982 in the article Notes on Casuarinaceae II in the Journal of the Adelaide Botanic Gardens.

References

External links
  Occurrence data for Allocasuarina striata from The Australasian Virtual Herbarium

striata
Flora of South Australia
Fagales of Australia